An U-hyeok (Korean:안우혁,安優爀 born 14 January 1964) is a South Korean former cyclist. He competed in the team pursuit event at the 1988 Summer Olympics.

References

External links

1964 births
Living people
South Korean male cyclists
Olympic cyclists of South Korea
Cyclists at the 1988 Summer Olympics
Place of birth missing (living people)
Asian Games medalists in cycling
Cyclists at the 1986 Asian Games
Medalists at the 1986 Asian Games
Asian Games silver medalists for South Korea
20th-century South Korean people
21st-century South Korean people